Banksia laevigata subsp. fuscolutea is a subspecies of Banksia laevigata. It is native to the Southwest Botanical Province of Western Australia.

References
 
 
 

laevigata subsp. fuscolutea
Eudicots of Western Australia
Plant subspecies